Khwarshi (also spelled Xvarshi, Khvarshi) is a Northeast Caucasian language spoken in the Tsumadinsky-, Kizilyurtovsky- and Khasavyurtovsky districts of Dagestan by the Khwarshi people. The exact number of speakers is not known, but the linguist Zaira Khalilova, who has carried out fieldwork in the period from 2005 to 2009, gives the figure 8,500. Other sources give much lower figures, such as Ethnologue with the figure 1,870 and the latest population census of Russia with the figure 1,872. The low figures are because many Khwarshi have registered themselves as being Avar speakers, because Avar is their literary language.

There are six dialects of the Khwarshi language based on their geographical distribution. The dialects are: Upper and Lower Inkhokwari, Kwantlada, Santlada, Khwayni and Khwarshi Proper, originating in their respective villages in the Tsumadinsky district. Due to emigration, Kwantlada-, Upper and Lower Inkhokwari–speaking communities also exist in Oktyabrskoe, Santlada-speaking communities exist in Pervomayskoe and Khwarshi Proper–speaking communities exist in Mutsalaul.

Phonology 
The phoneme inventory of Khwarshi is large, with about 87 distinct phonemes. Notable phonological processes include assimilation, vowel harmony, and nasalization occurring. The syllabic structure of Khwarshi is also quite simple, with (C)V(C) being the most common structure, of which V(C) is only permitted word-initially.

Vowels 
Khwarshi has a total number of 21 vowel phonemes, including vowel length and nasalization.

All the vowels above also have a long counterpart, which are always in stressed syllables. All vowels can occur in closed syllables (i.e. (C)VC), and all except  occur in open syllables (i.e. (C)V).  does not occur in the Khwarshi Proper and Inkhokwari dialects.

All the nasal vowels above except /ĩ/ have a long counterpart.
There is no nasalized version of /ɨ/.
The Khwarshi Proper dialect does not have nasalized vowels and replaces these with their non-nasalized counterparts.

Consonants 
Khwarshi has 66 consonants:

Therefore, it is shown in parentheses in the chart above.

The palatalized consonant and all the pharyngealized consonants are not found in Khwarshi Proper, but can be found in all the other dialects.

Gemination 
Gemination is quite a common phonological process in Khwarshi, caused by grammatical processes. Gemination only occurs intervocally and not all consonants geminate. Which consonants that geminate is different according to which processes they are a part of, and it depends on the dialect as well.

Below is a list of some of the processes causing gemination:

 When suffixing the past participle-ending  to a verbal stem ending in a consonant, the final consonant is geminated, e.g.  "to eat" >  "eaten".
"to eat" >  "eat-". Notice that ejectivization is lost with the present tense-ending, while it is kept with the past participle-ending.
 When suffixing the verbal noun-ending  to a verbal stem, the verbal noun-ending is geminated - not the final consonant, e.g.  "to drop" >  "something which has been dropped".
 When infixing the potential marker  to a verbal stem, the potential marker is geminated, e.g.  "to drop" >  "to potentially drop".
 When emphasis is needed, the consonants of some words may be geminated, e.g.  "much" >  "much indeed". It is highly idiomatic though, and does not apply to all words.

In loanwords, geminated consonants are normally non-geminated, when adopted into the Khwarshi language. Another interesting aspect of loanwords of Tindi origin in the Khwarshi language is that the consonants are ejectivized when they enter the Khwarshi language, e.g. Tindi  "small intestine" > Khwarshi .

Grammar

Nouns 
Khwarshi nouns inflect for case, of which there are 50, and number, singular or plural, and belong to one of five genders, or rather noun classes. That a noun belongs to a specific class cannot be seen on the noun itself, but only through agreement.

Noun classes 
There are five noun classes in the singular, but only a distinction between human and non-human in the plural, the male human and female human having merged into human, and the remaining classes into non-human.

 Only before nasalized vowels.
 ∅- indicates the lack of a prefix.

The noun classes are visible through agreement in adjectives, adverbs, postpositions and demonstrative pronouns, and also verbs if the verb begins with a vowel. There are, however, some exceptions, like with irregular verbs in other languages. Below are some examples of such agreement in postpositions, demonstrative pronouns, verbs and adjectives, respectively. Notice however, that a verb is present in all of the examples but the first, while the third example has a special focus on verbs.

As the noun class of a noun cannot be seen on the noun itself, it should not be represented in a literal translation. In the examples above, however, the noun class of certain nouns is shown, albeit in superscript to indicate that it is not represented in the original Khwarshi sentence. The only nouns that have their noun classes indicated here are those with which the other words agree with.

Cases 
There are 8 grammatical cases in Khwarshi, and 42 locative cases. The grammatical cases are: absolutive, ergative, two genitive, instrumental, durative, vocative and causal. The remaining cases, the locative cases, are a bit more complex, as they each consist of both a part that has something to do with orientation and a part that has something to do with direction. So while the ergative case has a single suffix /-(j)i/, the superversative case consists of two suffixes, the superessive /-t͡ɬʼo/ plus the versative /-ʁul/, becoming /-t͡ɬʼoʁul/.

Below are the case endings of the grammatical cases.

 The ergative case ending is /-ji/ after vowels, and /-i/ after consonants.

Below are the case endings of the locative cases.

Verbs 
Khwarshi verbs normally consist of a stem, an agreement prefix indicating noun class and number of the relevant nouns, and a suffix showing tense, aspect, mood, or the like. Only about one fourth of the Khwarshi verbs show agreement, all of them beginning with a vowel. There is a small number of verbs beginning with a vowel that do not show agreement. Verbs beginning with a consonant do not show agreement.

The verbs are very regular in Khwarshi, the only irregular verb being the auxiliary verb /goli/ "to be", which takes neither a prefix nor a suffix and has only several non-finite forms. In the past- and future tense, however, the verb /-et͡ʃ-/ "to be situated" is used instead of /goli/, which may take both a prefix and a suffix.

References

Notes

General

External links 
 Khwarshi basic lexicon at the Global Lexicostatistical Database
 Khalilova, Zaira (2007). Long-distance Agreement in Khwarshi
 Khalilova, Zaira (2007). Reflexives in Khwarshi

Agglutinative languages
Northeast Caucasian languages
Languages of Russia